Earsham is a village and civil parish in the English county of Norfolk. The village is located close to the border between Norfolk and Suffolk, and the River Waveney.

History
Earsham's name is of Anglo-Saxon origin and derives from the Old English for the homestead or settlement of an earl or built around a hill.

Earsham Mill has stood in some form in the village since the time of the Anglo-Saxons, using the River Waveney to grind wheat into flour. The mill building still exists today.

In the Domesday Book, Earsham is listed as a settlement of 69 households in its own hundred. In 1086, the village was part of the East Anglian estates of King William I.

Earsham Hall was built in the Eighteenth Century by John Buxton and was first inhabited by Lt-Col. William Windham. The hall was remodelled in the Georgian style by Sir John Soane and exists today as a venue for wedding receptions and antiques dealing.

Geography
According to the 2011 Census, Earsham has a population of 882 residents living in 379 households.

Earsham falls within the constituency of South Norfolk and is represented at Parliament by Richard Bacon MP of the Conservative Party. For the purposes of local government, the parish falls within the district of South Norfolk.

All Saints' Church
Earsham's parish church dates from the Fourteenth Century and is rare for an East Anglian church due to the fact it features a spire. The stone font depicts the seven sacraments and crucifixion of Jesus Christ whilst the Continental stained glass shows Saint Joseph amongst others.

Amenities
Earsham's Queen's Head has operated as a coaching inn since the mid-Nineteenth Century, the pub remains open to this day.

Transport
Earsham railway station opened in 1860 as a stop on the Waveney Valley Line connecting Tivetshall to Beccles. The station was closed in 1953.

Notable Residents
 Lt-Col. William Windham (1674-1730)- British Army officer and politician
 William Windham (1706-1789)- British landowner and politician

War Memorial
Earsham's war memorial takes the form of a stone column topped with a Celtic cross located on the village green, the memorial is supplemented by a wooden Roll of Honour inside All Saints' Church. The memorial lists the following names for the First World War:
 Lieutenant Robert P. Meade (1896-1916), 13th Battalion, Rifle Brigade
 Sergeant Albert Clarke (d.1916), 1st Battalion, Royal Norfolk Regiment
 Corporal H. J. Holland (d.1919), 1054th (Motor Transport) Company, Royal Army Service Corps
 Corporal Hennes R. Bedwell (1889-1916), 8th Battalion, East Lancashire Regiment
 Corporal Sidney W. Threadgold (1894-1918), Reserve Depot, Royal Air Force
 Corporal William R. Barber (1894-1918), Royal Field Artillery
 Deckhand James E. Howlett (d.1916), H.M. Drifter Enterprise II
 Deckhand William W. Remblance (1890-1916), H.M. Drifter Kent County
 Driver William Page (d.1917), Depot, Royal Army Service Corps
 Gunner William Jolly (1872-1918), 38th Company, Royal Garrison Artillery
 Private Edward J. Gooch (d.1914), 1st Battalion, Cheshire Regiment
 Private William H. Howell (1900-1919), 5th Battalion, Middlesex Regiment
 Private William Wilby (d.1916), 2nd Battalion, Royal Norfolk Regiment
 Private Edgar G. Prime (1898-1917), 8th Battalion, Royal Norfolk Regiment
 Private Herbert G. Houghton (1895-1918), 9th Battalion, Royal Norfolk Regiment
 Private John K. High (d.1917), 2nd Battalion, Oxfordshire and Buckinghamshire Light Infantry
 Private Charles W. Hood (1895-1917), 1/5th Battalion, Suffolk Regiment
 Private Victor J. Remblance (1897-1916), 6th Battalion, Suffolk Regiment
 Private Albert G. Threadgold (1897-1916), 9th Battalion, Suffolk Regiment
 Private Samuel Barnes (1886-1916), 9th Battalion, Worcestershire Regiment
 Trumpeter Arthur T. Tibbenham (1891-1917), 1/1st Battalion, Essex Yeomanry
 Yeoman Bernard S. Banham (d.1916), HMS Shark
 H.W. Runacles
 L.W. Saunders
 A. Smith

And, the following for the Second World War:
 Chief-Petty-Officer Alfred L. Lewis (1912-1942), HMS Niger
 Able-Seaman Ronald T. Gilham (d.1942), HMS Cornwall
 Guardsman Frederick C. Gooch (1916-1940), 2nd Battalion, Coldstream Guards
 Gunner Frederick J. Howell (1923-1943), 14th (Anti-Tank) Regiment, Royal Artillery
 Marine Thomas E. Southgate (1921-1941), HMS Hood
 Private E. William Longshaw (1920-1944), 4th Battalion, Royal Norfolk Regiment
 Private Victor R. Canham (1919-1940), 7th Battalion, Royal Norfolk Regiment

References

External links

Villages in Norfolk
Civil parishes in Norfolk